The 1995 Lunar New Year Cup was an exhibition association football tournament that took place in Hong Kong. Yugoslavia won the tournament after beating South Korea 1–0 in the final with a goal from Darko Kovačević.

Participants
  Hong Kong League XI (host)

Results

Semifinals

Third place match

Final

Statistics

Goalscorers

See also
LG Cup

References

External links
Results

International association football competitions hosted by Hong Kong
1995 in South Korean football
1994–95 in Yugoslav football
1995 in Colombian football